Kaina Mountain is located in the Lewis Range, Glacier National Park in the U.S. state of Montana. Kaina Mountain is in the northeastern section of Glacier National Park and north of Kaina Lake.

Climate
Based on the Köppen climate classification, Kaina is located in an alpine subarctic climate zone with long, cold, snowy winters, and cool to warm summers. Winter temperatures can drop below −10 °F with wind chill factors below −30 °F.

Geology

Like other mountains in Glacier National Park, Kaina is composed of sedimentary rock laid down during the Precambrian to Jurassic periods.

See also
 Mountains and mountain ranges of Glacier National Park (U.S.)

References

Mountains of Glacier County, Montana
Mountains of Glacier National Park (U.S.)
Lewis Range